Possilpark is a district in the Scottish city of Glasgow, situated north of the River Clyde and centred around Saracen Street. The area developed around Saracen Foundry of Walter MacFarlane & Co., which was the main employer. In the wake of the Saracen Foundry's closure in 1967, this part of Glasgow became one of the poorest in the United Kingdom, and decades later deprivation and crime rates remain high.

A variety of diverse community organisations operate in the area, providing arts, sports, health and gardening provision and community regeneration, including Young People's Futures, The Concrete Garden, Possobilities and Friends of Possilpark Greenspace. The district is served by both Possilpark & Parkhouse and Ashfield railway stations on the Maryhill Line.

History

Upper and Lower Possil estate

In 1242, Alexander II of Scotland granted certain lands to the Bishop of Glasgow. These included the lands in the north referred to as Possele, divided in the sixteenth century into Over or Upper Possil, and Nether or Lower Possil.

The region known as Nether Possil was acquired in 1595 by Robert Crawford, who was the son of Hew Crawford of Cloberhill. In 1644 James Gilhagie of Kenniehill bought the estate, part of an old and rich Glasgow family with interests in coal, the Caribbean, Madeira and the Canary Islands. However, by 1698 Gilhagie had fallen on hard times, and after burning his properties in 1677 in Saltmarket and adjoining streets, applied to the Scots Parliament for assistance. After passing through various creditors hands, the lands were acquired in 1697 by Edinburgh writer John Forbes, who built a house. After being owned by his son, the estate was sold to in 1744 to merchant William Crawfurd of Birkhead, who in 1749 acquired Easter Nether Possil, he thus reunited the lands which had been subdivided in 1588.

In 1808, the estate was acquired by Colonel Alexander Campbell, son of Glasgow merchant John Campbell senior, founder of the West Indian trading house of John Campbell sen. & Co. Colonel Campbell had served during the battles in South Africa, being present at the capture of the Cape of Good Hope in 1806, and at the Battle of Corunna where he commanded the 20th Regiment. Having bought the adjoining estate of Keppoch in 1838, the family seat had transferred there. Campbell rented Possil house and a park to Sir Archibald Alison, 1st Baronet, who as the lawyer son of Scottish writer Archibald Alison, had in 1834 become Sheriff of Lanarkshire. The house and park lands as laid out then, were described then as:

Saracen Foundry

On the death of Colonel Campbell in 1849, the estate passed to his son. When Walter MacFarlane wished to vastly expand his Saracen Foundry company, Campbell agreed to sell MacFarlane  of the estate including the house, on which to build a vast new works.

MacFarlane renamed the estate Possilpark, which grew from a population of 10 people in 1872 to 10,000 by 1891, at which time the area was incorporated into the city officially. MacFarlane oversaw the removal of all the woodlands and after creating railway access to his foundry, laid out the rest of the park land as a grid plan of streets and tenements, including naming the main street running through the new suburb "Saracen Street". After Alison's death in 1867, the main house was also demolished as the foundry works expanded.

The grid layout of Possilpark was described by the then Glasgow Town Council as: "... [o]ne of the finest and best conducted in Glasgow, and the new suburb of Possil Park, laid out by them with skill and intelligence, is rapidly becoming an important addition to the great city." The Saracen foundry made a series of decorative iron works, from railings and water fountains to park bandstands. These were exported all over the British Empire, and can still be found in many parts of Britain, including a reproduction placed at Saracen Cross in Possilpark itself in 2001.

After World War II, the combination of the collapse of the British Empire, the move away from steam power and the adaptation of new designs and materials meant a vast decline in orders for Saracen's standard cast iron designs. The MacFarlane company moved into standard foundry work, including being one of five foundries casting Sir Giles Gilbert Scott's classic K6 telephone box for Post Office Telephones. After a take over of the company in 1965, the works closed and the infrastructure was demolished in 1967. The foundry site is now occupied by a number of commercial firms, including Allied Motors.

Present day

Within fifteen years of the closing of the Saracen foundry, Possil had become the hub of the Glasgow heroin trade, and was to remain so during the 1980s.  Large portions of the Possil have been destroyed, many of the old tenements being flattened and the residents forced to move to other areas.  Saracen Street remains the main shopping area, but the whole area has been undergoing mass redevelopment since the late 1990s, which has seen many new houses being built.  More and more small local businesses are appearing in Saracen Street as well.  A sports centre (Millennium Centre) was constructed to highlight the rebirth of Possil, but has since closed down and been demolished.  However, the area is improving with better standards in the community, and a Strathclyde Police crackdown on the overflowing drug wars and usage, though this has latterly been threatened by nationwide budget cuts.

Following the lead of his friend Sir Tom Hunter, in April 2008, English real estate tycoon Nick Leslau spent 10 days in Possilpark filming Channel 4's The Secret Millionaire, eventually giving away £225,000 to projects including Possobilities, formerly known as The Disability Community.

In 2012, the 'Scottish Index of Multiple Deprivation' analysis by the Scottish Government identified Possilpark and Keppochhill as the 2nd and 3rd most deprived areas in Scotland.

Notable residents
 
Peter Capaldi, actor
Kevin Harper, footballer
Eddie Kelly, footballer
Dickson Mabon, politician
Willy Maley, literary critic
Lena Martell, singer
Alex Massie, footballer
Gil Paterson, politician
Willie Carr, footballer
Gerry Gray, footballer
Jim Watt, world champion boxer
Kenny Dalglish, international footballer attended Possil Senior Secondary and played for Possilpark YMCA
Alex McDade, writer of the original version of the Jarama Valley song during the Spanish Civil War
Jake Black, singer of Alabama 3, song writer of the famous Sopranos theme tune 'Woke Up This Morning'
Edward McGuire, composer

See also
 Glasgow tower blocks

References

External links
 
Possil House and history at the University of Strathclyde's digital library

Areas of Glasgow
Housing estates in Glasgow